The 2017–18 Gaza Strip Premier League is the 2017–18 season of the top football league in the Gaza Strip of Palestine.

Standings

See also
2017–18 West Bank Premier League
2017–18 Palestine Cup

References

External links
Palestina 2017/18 Gaza Strip League, RSSSF.com

Gaza Strip Premier League seasons
2
Gaza